Jagatballavpur Assembly constituency is an assembly constituency in Howrah district in the Indian state of West Bengal.

Overview
As per orders of the Delimitation Commission, No. 183 Jagatballavpur Assembly constituency  is composed of the following:Baragachhia I, Baragachhia II, Hantal Anantabati, Jagatballavpur I, Jagatballavpur II, Pantihal, Shankarhati I, Shankarhati II, Shialdanga, Laskarpur, Polgustia, Gobindapur, Islampur and Maju gram panchayats of Jagatballavpur community development block and Begari, Domjur, Dakshin Jhapardaha, Parbatipur, Rudrapur, Uttar Jhapardaha and Makardah I gram panchayats of Domjur community development block.

Jagatballavpur Assembly constituency is part of No. 27 Sreerampur (Lok Sabha constituency).

Members of Legislative Assembly

Election results

2021

2016
Trinamul Congress candidate Md. Abdul Ghani wins the seat.

2011

 

.# Swing calculated on Congress+Trinamool Congress vote percentages taken together in 2006.

1977-2006
In the 2006 state assembly elections Biplab Majumdar of CPI(M) won in the Jagatballavpur seat defeating his nearest rival Biman Chakraborty of Trinamool Congress. Contests in most years were multi cornered but only winners and runners are being mentioned. In the 2001 elections Biman Chakraborty of Trinamool Congress defeated M. Ansaruddin of CPI(M). M.Ansaruddin of CPI(M) defeated Nityananda Maity of Congress in 1996, Pulak Sarkar of Congress in 1991, Binodananda Banerjee of Congress in 1987, Nemai Porel, Independent in 1982 and Brindaban Ghosh of Congress in 1977.

1951-1977
Tarapada Dey of CPI(M) won in 1972, 1971 and 1969. B.B.Bose of CPI(M) won in 1967. Satyanarayan Khan of Congress won in 1962. Brindaban Behari Basu of Forward Bloc (Marxist) won in 1957. Amrita Lal Hazra of Congress won in 1951.

References

Assembly constituencies of West Bengal
Politics of Howrah district
1952 establishments in West Bengal
Constituencies established in 1952